"Love It When You Hate Me" is a song by Canadian singer Avril Lavigne featuring American singer Blackbear. It was released on January 14, 2022, through Elektra Records as the second single from Lavigne's seventh studio album, Love Sux (2022).

Background
"Love It When You Hate Me" was released the same day as Lavigne announced the title, release date and track list of Love Sux.

Promotion
In the United States, "Love It When You Hate Me" was sent to contemporary hit radio on January 25, 2022 and to adult contemporary radio on February 7, 2022. It was also sent to Italian radio.

Critical reception
Ali Shutner from NME described "Love It When You Hate Me" as a "pop-punk banger", and Emily Carter writing for Kerrang! noted that the song "hears the Canadian star embracing nostalgic pop-punk in the chorus – 'The highs the lows the yes, the nos / You're so hot when you get cold / Don't call me baby / I love it when you hate me' – and fresher elements in the verses."

Accolades

Commercial performance
"Love It When You Hate Me" debuted at number 76 on Canadian Hot 100. In the United States, the song debuted at number 15 on the Billboard Hot Rock & Alternative Songs. It peaked at number 25 on the Mainstream Top 40 chart, and number 18 on the US Adult Top 40 chart, It was Lavigne's biggest hit on the chart since her 2011 single "What the Hell".

Music video
It opens up with Avril being chased by paparazzi after a prison sentence due to "falling in love too many times". The video mainly shows Lavigne, Blackbear and Barker performing inside of a prison cell with dancing female inmates. The ending showed Lavigne flipping off the press following her release for bad behavior. The music video was nominated for 2022 MTV Video Music Awards' Best Alternative music video, it was Lavigne's first Video Music Award nomination since her 2007 single "Girlfriend".

Track listing
Digital download
"Love It When You Hate Me" (featuring Blackbear) – 2:25

Streaming (explicit)
"Love It When You Hate Me" (featuring Blackbear) – 2:25
"Bite Me" – 2:39
"Bite Me" (acoustic) – 3:09

Streaming (clean)
"Love It When You Hate Me" (featuring Blackbear) – 2:25
"Bite Me" – 2:39

Credits and personnel
Credits and personnel are adapted from the Love Sux album liner notes.
 Avril Lavigne – vocals, writer
 John Feldmann – writer, producer, guitar, bass
 Derek "Mod Sun" Smith – writer, producer
 Matthew Musto – writer, vocals
 Travis Barker – producer, drums
 Manny Marroquin – mixing
 Dylan McLean – additional production and engineering, additional guitar and bass
 Scot Stewart – additional production and engineering, additional guitar and bass
 Michael Bono – additional production and engineering, additional guitar and bass
 Josh Thornberry – additional production and engineering
 Cameron Mizell – additional production and engineering
 Hero DeLano – additional production and engineering
 Kevin Thrash – additional engineering
 Andrew Goldstein – additional engineering
 Chris Gehringer – mastering

Charts

Weekly charts

Year-end charts

Release history

References

2022 singles
2022 songs
Avril Lavigne songs
DTA Records singles
Elektra Records singles
Song recordings produced by John Feldmann
Songs written by Avril Lavigne
Songs written by John Feldmann
Songs written by Blackbear (musician)